Idiophyseter is a genus of macroraptorial sperm whale from the Miocene. Its fossils have been found in Templeton California. Idiophyseter was small in size compared to modern genera and its maxilla has single-rooted alveoli. It lacked ventral internal process of the sort present in the modern day genus of sperm whale (Physeter).

References

Sperm whales
Prehistoric toothed whales
Prehistoric cetacean genera